McCarrick is a surname. Notable people with the surname include:

Mark McCarrick (born 1962), English former professional footballer
Martin McCarrick (born 1962), English cellist, keyboardist and guitarist
Theodore McCarrick (born 1930), defrocked American prelate, former Catholic cardinal and archbishop
Cardinal McCarrick High School, Catholic secondary school located in South Amboy, New Jersey, United States